Coptosia bithynensis is a species of beetle in the family Cerambycidae. It was described by Ganglbauer in 1884, originally under the genus Phytoecia. It is known from Bulgaria, Turkey, Armenia, and possibly Romania.

Varietas
 Coptosia bithynensis var. amasina Pic, 1949
 Coptosia bithynensis var. limbata Pic, 1949
 Coptosia bithynensis var. mardinensis Pic, 1901
 Coptosia bithynensis var. trilineata (Pic, 1892)

References

Saperdini
Beetles described in 1884